The 2000 Majorca Open was a men's tennis tournament played on outdoor clay courts. It was the 6th edition of the Open de Tenis Comunidad Valenciana, and was part of the International Series of the 2000 ATP Tour. It took place at the Club de Tenis Valencia in Majorca from 1 May through 8 May 2000.

The 32-player strong singles field featured ATP No. 3, Australian Open runner-up and London finalist Yevgeny Kafelnikov, 1998 Australian Open winner and former world no. 1 Marcelo Ríos and Casablanca titlist Fernando Vicente. Also competing were Barcelona champion Marat Safin, Estoril winner and two-time Grand Slam finalist Carlos Moyá, Mariano Puerta and Francisco Clavet.

Marat Safin won the singles title.

Finals

Singles

 Marat Safin defeated  Mikael Tillström 6–4, 6–3
 It was Safin's 2nd title of the year, and his 3rd overall.

Doubles

 Michaël Llodra /  Diego Nargiso defeated  Alberto Martín /  Fernando Vicente 7–6(7–2), 7–6(7–3)
 It was Llodra's only title of the year and the 1st of his career. It was Nargiso's only title of the year and the 5th of his career.

References

External links
 Official website

 

 
Majorca Open